Ayrancı is a town and district of Karaman Province in the Central Anatolia region of Turkey. According to 2000 census, population of the district is 13,212 of which 3,153 live in the town of Ayrancı.

History
The town of Ayrancı was among the numerous locations that imperial Ottoman and republican Turkish governments settled the incoming Crimean Tatars who were forced out of their homeland by the Russian Empire in late 19th and early 20th century. The town remained as a predominantly Crimean Tatar settlement in Central Anatolia until recently. The town was a part of Konya Province but became a part of Karaman with the creation of the Karaman Province.

Notes

References

External links

 District governor's official website 
 District municipality's official website 

 
Populated places in Karaman Province
Towns in Turkey